Icel (c. 460c. 535), also spelt Icil, is a possible king of Mercia. He was supposedly the son of Eomer (443–489), last King of the Angles in Angeln. Icel supposedly led his people across the North Sea to Britain around 515 during the Anglo-Saxon settlement of Britain. Icel was the eponymous ancestor of his grandfather's family, the Iclingas.

History

Icel was born before 489, probably around 460. He became king of Anglia upon his father's death in 489. He was the last king of Anglia, migrating to England around 515. During the same year, he became king of Mercia.

By 527, Icel had worked his way through East Anglia and into Mercia, as it has been reported in the 13th century manuscript known as the Flores Historiarum: “Pagans came from Germany and occupied East Anglia, that is, the country of the East Angles; and some of them invaded Mercia, and waged war against the British.” By his death c. 535, it is reported that Icel held large portions of both East Anglia and Mercia, and therefore could be considered the first true king of Mercia. Icel was succeeded by Cnebba shortly after his death.

References

 

Anglo-Saxon royalty
Anglish people
5th-century English monarchs
6th-century English monarchs
 
Mercian monarchs
460s births
530s deaths